Chorão, also known as Choddnnem (pronounced choddne the letter m is silent) or Chodan, is an island along the Mandovi River near Tiswadi, Goa, India. It is the largest among other 17 islands of Goa.

Chorão is accessible by the ferry from Ribandar. Chorão village is known for its Luso-Goan churches and houses. It is also known for its bird sanctuary. It is one of 6 major islands between the Mandovi and Zuari, the others being:
 Ilhas de Goa
 Divar,
 Cumbarjua,
 St Estevam,
 Vanxim and
 Several other small mangrove islands and sand banks.

Etymology
Etymologically, the island's name "Choddnnem" is derived from the Sanskrit word . Chudda means headwear and Monnim (Mani) signifies some thing worn in the shape of a necklace or a jewel of cylindrical shape. 
The Portuguese noblemen found the island a pleasurable place to live and hence the name Ilha dos Fidalgos (Island of Noblemen).

History

Pre-Portuguese History of Chorão

'The First Wave' of Indo-Aryan migration to Goa happened between the Christian era 4th–3rd century BC to 3rd–4th century AD. Descendants of these settlers eventually formed 96 Brahmin clans. Ninety-six in Konkani is Shennai, from which comes the surname Shenoy or Shenvi (spelled Sinai in Portuguese). Of the ninety-six Sinai clans, ten families settled in Chorão. The Shenvi Brahmins would henceforth go on to dominate the socio-economic and religious sphere of Goan life.

According to Goan historian José Gerson da Cunha, Chorão was a site of an ancient Tirtha (sacred pool) and was known as Mahakshetra (Great country or place). The Shenvi Brahmins were much respected, handsome, well-behaved and skillful. Jesuit missionary and writer Luís Fróis described the residents of Chorão as follows, "These Brahmins are very polite and of keen intelligence. They are fine gentlemen, fair and well proportioned. Possessing many qualities which are not possible to enumerate. The wives of these Brahmins are a reserved type of people, steady in their habits. They are honest, naturally modest in their disposition and are devoted to their husbands whom they serve well. They do not remarry on the death of their husbands and do not use coloured dresses and since the imposition of the law forbidding sati or widow burning they shave their heads even though they may be young. Their sons are very able men, fair, gentle in their demeanour and of good common sense". (The tonsuring of widows was also later abolished by the Portuguese like Sati system.)

Chorão's Brahmins were served by temple attendants called Kalavants (the community is now known as Gomantak Maratha Samaj in Goa). According to P. D. Xavier, "the Kalavant system might have originated from the widows who ran away and took shelter in the village temples to escape sati, the inhuman practice of burning the widow on her husband"s pyre."

Christianization of Chorão 
The island was Christianised by the Jesuits as they did the adjoining islands of Divar and Salcete. In 1510, this area was one of the first to be conquered by the Portuguese and by 1552, the island of Chorão had a population of just above 3,000, 300 of whom were Christian and by this time, a small church was built. By the end of 1559, over 1,200 had accepted baptism in total. The following year, in 1560, the first bishop from the Jesuit order, Dom João Nunes de Barreto set up residence in Chorão, which eventually became a Noviciate.

Jesuit missionary and writer Luís Fróis in his letter dated 10 December 1560 says "Most of these Brahmins can speak Portuguese and are happy to learn the doctrine pertaining to Faith and Morals". With incredible brevity the whole of the Island of Chorão prepared itself for the general baptism which was fixed for 8 August 1560. The archbishop along with some priests visited Chorão Island first, followed by Father Melchior Carneiro and the provincial. It being the month of August, a time when it rains heavily, the repairs of the church were hurriedly completed. The Viceroy Dom Constantino of Braganza came with retinue and brought his musicians who played on a variety of instruments like trumpets, drums and charamelas. Viceroy Dom Constantino of Braganza also stood as god-father (sponsor) to the important men of the place treating them with love and affection. This alone was more than sufficient to keep the neophytes happy. As many as possible were baptised that evening. Father Joseph Ribeiro stayed behind and baptized the remaining. In all, therefore the number of the converts reached 1207, the greater part of the people of the Island having already been baptized before.

Fróis says that a greater number of those who embraced Christianity in Chorão were Chaudarins (Toddy-Tappers). They also made better Christians and being more homely, were easy to be converted. They made their confession during Lent, some confessed their sins fortnightly, others monthly and six or seven of them every Sunday and they received Communion in the Church of Our Lady of Grace Church (Chorão Island).

Some Chorão women, on the occasion of their baptism, wore some much gold to the extent of astonishing the missionaries. They belong to the caste of Chardo. In 1566 Chorão had 2470 converts and few Brahmins had promised to become Roman Catholics later. In 1582 there were three thousand converts in Chorão and all its inhabitants were Roman Catholics and many came from outside to receive baptism.

Ilha dos Fidalgos 
A large number of magnificent buildings with storeys rose up surrounded by lovely flower garden and sometimes due to want of space attached to one another. It was here that most of the nobility and rich resided, spending a life of comfort and luxury. This was the reason why Chorão Island became known as "Ilha dos Fidalgos" (Island of Noblemen).

Tradition has it that when these Fidalgos went for Mass, a special place was set apart to protect their superfine umbrellas, chiefly made of red damask. The fidalgos would be found often lounging near the ferry point on the south-eastern side of the island, waiting for patmarios (sail boats) to cross over to Old Goa or Ribandar. The Fidalgos as well as the common folk took great delight in chewing on snacks available then and gulped down hot tea in the shacks. They enjoyed the freshly steamed merem (snack) and sipped the hot cha (tea) at that spot.

Cheese of Chorão 
Chorão was once famous for its European-style ripened cheese, produced from dairy cattle since the 16th century, and known as Queijo da Ilha de Chorão (Cheese from the island of Chorão). Chorão Cheese was popular with both the Goan natives and the Portuguese gentry in Goa. Chorão Cheese also used to be exported even as far as Macau. Due to the emigration of cheesemakers from the island, the cheese industry became extinct in the 19th century.

Forts of Chorão 
Two well equipped fortresses guarded Chorão Island from the incursion of Marathas. The Fortaleza de São Bartolomeu de Chorão (Saint Bartholomew Fort of Chorão) was built in 1720 in the north eastern part of Chorão Island. It had a lovely castle within its enclosures. Among other things it had eleven turrets (tinha onze pecas) and was used for the defense of the fort that surrounded Chorão island and those of Calvim. According to Sketch of the City of Goa by Jose Nicolau da Fonseca, it was probably erected at the same time as the Fort of Naroa. The Saint Bartholomew Fort was abandoned in 1811 and now lies in total ruins.

Epidemics in Chorão Island
Main Article : Epidemics in Chorão Island

Education Institutions

In 1559, the Jesuits founded a school in Chorão for the children of the village. It is recorded that the number of them at one time reached 400. Reading, writing and Christian doctrine were taught in this school. According to the belief of the people the school was functioning in a building situated at the western part of the hill built as a residence of the Jesuits by Fr. Dom João Nunes Baretto S.J. Patriarch of Ethiopia. The Konkani language which was a great help for the conversion work was probably taught in this school. It was meant for the Jesuits.

Seminary of Chorão 
Main Article : Real Colégio de Educação de Chorão

Latin School 
According to a decree issued on 19 April 1871 after a resolution had been passed by the Communidade of Chorão on 6 February 1870, it was decided to establish on the Island of Chorão at the expense of the Communidade of Chorão a School of Latin, the payment of the Professor who was to be appointed by the Government of the State.

English School 
In 1944 Fr. Elias Gama wanted to built a new English School in Chorão Island, he could not do it as there was one founded by Mr. Januario Pereira of Boctavaddo, St Barthomews High School, though it was not actually running. It was the merit of Fr. Elias Gama to restart it. On 6 November 1952 new building of School was inaugurated by Dom José da Costa Nunes. The medium is English and the School prepares for the S.S.C examination

Villages 
The Chorão island constituted of three comunidades namely:

Saude is the centre of the island.

Chorão 
This village is located on the south of the island.

Village Church 
Igreja de Nossa Senhora de Graça Our Lady of Grace Church (Chorão Island)

Ambelim 
This village is located on the north west of the island.

Village Church 
Igreja de São Bartolomeu, Chorão St Bartholomew's Church (Chorão Island)

Caraim (Caroi) 
This village is located on the north east of the island.

Village Church 
Capela de Nossa Senhora da Saúde (Chorão Island)

Bird Sanctuary 
The Chorão Island is attractive primarily because of its amazing flora and fauna. There are many mangroves – the amazing and beautiful forests growing in the water.

Chorão is also home to the Salim Ali Bird Sanctuary, in the western part of the island, on an area of 178 hectares. It is the largest bird sanctuary of Goa is located. The reserve has got its name from the famous Indian ornithologist Dr. Salim Ali and now it proudly bears the name of "Salim Ali Bird Sanctuary". The territory of this National Park is inhabited by migratory and local birds of over 400 species. The crocodiles can also be seen among the aquatic inhabitants of Salim Ali Bird Sanctuary.

People of Chorão Island

Gallery

See also

Our Lady of Grace Church (Chorão Island)
Chapel of St. Jerome (Chorão Island)
St Bartholomew's Church (Chorão Island)
Capela de Nossa Senhora da Saúde (Chorão Island)
Chapel of Sacra Familia (Chorão Island)
Real Colégio de Educação de Chorão
Salim Ali Bird Sanctuary

References

Bibliography
The Island of Chorão (A Historical Sketch) By Francisco Xavier Gomes Catão, Mar Louis Memorial Press, Alwaye (1962)
Etimos das Aldeas de Goa, em o Oriente Portuguese, Chantre F.X VAZ, Vol XIII(1916)
The Koṅkaṇî Language and Literature By José Gerson da Cunha (1881)
An Historical and Archaeological Sketch of the City of Goa By Jose Nicolau Da Fonseca (1878)
Goa: Hindu temples and deities By Rui Gomes Pereira, Antonio Victor Couto Published by Pereira, (1978)
Conversions and Citizenry : Goa under Portugal, 1510–1610 By Délio de Mendonça (1958)

Notes

 
Islands of the River Mandovi
Comunidades of Goa
Konkani
Villages in North Goa district
Islands of Goa
Geography of North Goa district
Tourist attractions in North Goa district
Islands of India
Populated places in India